Ibrahim Imoro (born 2 October 1999) is a Ghanaian professional footballer who currently plays as a left-back for Ghana Premier League side Asante Kotoko S.C.

Career

Early career 
Imoro started his career with Windy Professionals. He was signed by 2017 Ghana Premier League newly promoted side Bolga All Stars. Bolga All stars placed last and were relegated from the league, but Imoro was one of their standout players within season. He was linked to Asante Kotoko during the transfer season, but he was eventually signed on a one-year loan contract by Nzema side Karela United FC for the 2018 Ghana Premier League season. He played 13 games for the side in the first round of the season until the league was suspended and later cancelled due to the Anas Number 12 scandal. His contract with Bolga All Stars expired and he was signed by lower division side Thunder FC.

Hapoel Tel Aviv 
Following the suspension and subsequent cancellation of the 2018 Ghana premier league, Imoro signed a pre-contract deal with Israeli giants Hapoel Tel Aviv. He trained with the first team squad ahead of the 2019–20 Israeli season with the hope of being signed before the season starts when the transfer period is open but the deal fell through.

Asante Kotoko 
In December 2019, Imoro was signed by Asante Kotoko from Thunder FC after training with the team for two weeks, on a 4-year long-term contract ahead of the 2019–20 season. On 22 December 2019, he won his first trophy with the club, after Asante Kotoko defeated their rivals Hearts of Oak by 2–1 victory in the President's Cup.

International career
Imoro represented the Ghana national team in a 3–1 2021 Africa Cup of Nations qualification win over São Tomé and Príncipe on 28 March 2021.

Honours 
Asante Kotoko

 Ghana Premier League: 2021–22
 President's Cup: 2019
Al-Hilal

 Sudan Cup: 2021–22

Individual

 Most Assists Ghana Premier League: 2021–22

References

External links 
 

Living people
1999 births
Ghanaian footballers
Ghana international footballers
Ghana Premier League players
Asante Kotoko S.C. players
Windy Professionals FC players
Association football defenders
Karela United FC players
Al-Hilal Club (Omdurman) players
Expatriate footballers in Sudan
Ghanaian expatriate sportspeople in Sudan
Ghanaian expatriate footballers